Pšurný (feminine: Pšurná) is a Czech surname. Notable people with the surname include:

 Michal Pšurný (born 1986), Czech ice hockey player
 Roman Pšurný (born 1986), Czech ice hockey player

Czech-language surnames